Peronia verruculata is a species of air-breathing sea slug, a shell-less marine pulmonate gastropod mollusk in the family Onchidiidae.

Distribution
This species is distributed in the Indian Ocean along Madagascar.

References

 Dayrat, B. (2009) Review of the current knowledge of the systematics of Onchidiidae (Mollusca: Gastropoda: Pulmonata) with a checklist of nominal species. Zootaxa 2068: 1–26

Onchidiidae
Gastropods described in 1830
Taxa named by Georges Cuvier